The Blanco Renaissance Museum is a museum located in Ubud on Bali, Indonesia that opened December 28, 1998.
It's devoted to the art of the painter Antonio Blanco.

Literature

References

External links 
 Homepage

Museums in Bali
Art museums and galleries in Indonesia
Ubud